Platelet glycoprotein Ib alpha chain also known as glycoprotein Ib (platelet), alpha polypeptide or CD42b (Cluster of Differentiation 42b), is a protein that in humans is encoded by the GP1BA gene.

Function 

Glycoprotein Ib (GP Ib) is a platelet surface membrane glycoprotein composed of a heterodimer, an alpha chain and a beta chain, that are linked by disulfide bonds.  The Gp Ib functions as a receptor for von Willebrand factor (VWF). The complete receptor complex includes noncovalent association of the alpha and beta subunits with platelet glycoprotein IX and platelet glycoprotein V to form the glycoprotein Ib-IX-V complex. The binding of the GP Ib-IX-V complex to VWF facilitates initial platelet adhesion to vascular subendothelium after vascular injury, and also initiates signaling events within the platelet that lead to enhanced platelet activation, thrombosis, and hemostasis.  This gene encodes the alpha subunit. Several polymorphisms and mutations have been described in this gene, some of which are the cause of Bernard–Soulier syndromes and platelet-type von Willebrand disease.

Interactions 

GP1BA has been shown to interact with YWHAZ and FLNB.

See also 
 Cluster of differentiation

References

Further reading

External links 
 

Clusters of differentiation